Algoid is an educational programming language developed around 2012, by Yann Caron a student of computer science at CNAM, (Conservatoire national des arts et métiers at Paris)

Features
Algoid is an educational language that allows the student to use different paradigms:
Imperative
Procedural
Functional
Recursive
Object-oriented (multi-inheritance)
Aspect-oriented programming.
It leads onto programming in industry standard language (such as C, Java and C++) and its syntax as close as possible to their respective syntaxes. It implements powerful idioms like meta-object protocol (from python) and cascade (from smalltalk).
 
To do this, the fundamental principles of Algoid are:

A function is an expression.
An object is an expression.
An expression is an object.
So a function is a meta-function and an object is a meta-object.

References

External links
Algoid website

Computer programming